Southern Bank is a bank based in Mount Olive, North Carolina. It is a wholly owned subsidiary of Southern BancShares (N.C.), Inc., a bank holding company.

The company operates 64 branches in North Carolina and Virginia.

History
Southern Bank was originally founded on January 29, 1901, as The Bank of Mount Olive.

The bank changed its name to Southern Bank and Trust Company on March 1, 1967, to reflect a more regional presence. The Home Office of the Bank is located at 116 East Main Street, Mount Olive, North Carolina. 

Southern BancShares (N.C.), Inc., was founded and established as the holding company of Southern Bank on January 1, 1983.

In 2011, the company acquired the assets and liabilities of the failed Bank of the Commonwealth.

On February 1, 2016, the bank merged with Heritage Bankshares.

References

Banks based in North Carolina